Wabern bei Bern railway station is a railway station in the Swiss canton of Bern and municipality of Köniz. It serves, and derives its name from, the village of Wabern bei Bern, in reality a suburb of the city of Bern. The station is on the Gürbetal line and is operated by BLS AG. 

Wabern bei Bern station is adjacent to the lower station of the Gurtenbahn, a funicular that provides access to the summit of the Gurten, as well as to the Gurtenbahn stop on Bern tramway route 9.

The station has a single island platform, flanked on each side by running lines that converge to a single track at each end of the station. The platform is accessed by a staircase from the overbridge carrying the access road to the Gurtenbahn, and by a subway from the station buildings, which lie on the northern side of the line.

Services 
The following services stop at Wabern bei Bern:

 Bern S-Bahn:
 : rush-hour service between Biel/Bienne and Belp.

Gallery

References

External links 
 
 

Köniz
Railway stations in the canton of Bern
BLS railway stations